Capriati a Volturno is a comune (municipality) in the Province of Caserta in the Italian region Campania, located about  north of Naples and about  northwest of Caserta.

Capriati a Volturno borders the following municipalities: Ciorlano, Fontegreca, Gallo Matese, Monteroduni, Pozzilli, Venafro.

References

Cities and towns in Campania